Hypsioma hezia is a species of beetle in the family Cerambycidae. It was described by Dillon and Dillon in 1945. It is known from Paraguay, Brazil and Argentina.

References

hezia
Beetles described in 1945